Bahrain Red Crescent Society was established in 1971, via a charter issued by Sheikh Isa bin Salman Al Khalifa, the Amir of Bahrain at the time. The society was recognized by the International Federation of Red Cross and Red Crescent Societies on 14 September 1972. It is the 116th member of the international group since its inception in 1919. It has its headquarters in Hoora, Manama.

References

External links
Bahrain Red Crescent Society Profile
Official International Federation of Red Cross and Red Crescent Societies Web Site

Red Cross and Red Crescent national societies
Organizations established in 1971
1971 establishments in Bahrain
Medical and health organisations based in Bahrain